Major General John Barker (1746April 3, 1818) was twice mayor of Philadelphia. He was also a tailor.

Barker served in the Revolutionary War and remained active in the military through 1808, when he retired as Major General of the First Brigade, First Division.

He served twice as sheriff of Philadelphia, from 1794 to 1797 and 1803 to 1807. He was appointed an alderman of the city of Philadelphia by Governor Thomas McKean on October 22, 1800. He was elected mayor by the Select and Common Councils on October 20, 1808, and was re-elected in 1809 and again, after an interval of two years, in 1812.

During the War of 1812, he served on the city's Committee of Defense.

He died in Philadelphia at age 72.

Family
He was the only son of James Barker. He was the father of playwright James Nelson Barker, who served in the army during the War of 1812, rising to the rank of major, and who was also later mayor of Philadelphia.

References

1740s births
1818 deaths
Continental Army officers from Pennsylvania
Mayors of Philadelphia
People of colonial Pennsylvania
People from Pennsylvania in the War of 1812
Sheriffs of Philadelphia